John Duckworth (1 November 1863 – 22 January 1946) was an English Liberal Party politician and cotton manufacturer.

Family
Duckworth was the son of George Duckworth. In 1890 he married Ruth Sutcliffe, the daughter of a Lancashire Justice of the Peace.

Politics
In 1923 he succeeded the sitting Liberal MP, Sir Henry Norman. According to The Times Newspaper, Duckworth was not associated with the internal feuding which had plagued the Liberals since the split between H H Asquith and David Lloyd George in December 1916 and this helped unify the two wings of the party there in the run up to the 1923 general election. Duckworth was elected Member of Parliament for Blackburn in 1923 and held the seat at the  1924 election. He served as MP until 1929 when he stood down from Parliament.

The Blackburn constituency was a two-member seat and the Liberals and Unionists remained in partnership there after 1918 against the socialist threat, maintaining the former wartime coalition arrangements. Each party contested one of the two seats, ensuring the anti-Labour vote was not split and so keeping Labour out. Duckworth carried on his alliance with the Tories inside Parliament. In January 1924 he was one of then Liberal MPs to defy his party line and vote with the Conservatives in an attempt to prevent the formation of the first Labour government under Ramsay MacDonald. He also voted with the Conservatives later that year in the division over the decision of the Poplar Board of Guardians to exceed the amount of relief they were entitled to dispense to the deserving poor and also on the government's naval estimates.

While in Parliament, Duckworth took an interest in agricultural affairs, with a particular reference to sugar-beet production and in foreign policy he was especially concerned with Anglo-Chinese relations

Cotton trader
He was managing director of Mssrs. John Duckworth and Sons, cotton manufacturers and traders of Blackburn. In 1927, Duckworth led a deputation of representatives of the Lancashire cotton industry to meet the Home Secretary on the question of the Factories Bill.

References

External links 
 

1863 births
1946 deaths
Liberal Party (UK) MPs for English constituencies
UK MPs 1923–1924
UK MPs 1924–1929
Politics of Blackburn with Darwen